The Diocese of Nagpur is an Anglican diocese of Church of North India headquartered in the city of Nagpur.

Bishops
The Bishop of Nagpur was the Ordinary of the Anglican Diocese of Nagpur from its inception in 1903 until the foundation of the Church in India, Pakistan, Burma and Ceylon in 1927; and since then head of one of the united church's dioceses.

See also

Christianity in India
Church of North India

References

External links
History of Anglican Catholic Church
Centenary celebrations

Anglican bishops of Nagpur
Lists of Anglican bishops and archbishops
India religion-related lists
1903 establishments in India
Church of North India
Anglican dioceses in Asia